In general topology and related areas of mathematics, the final topology (or coinduced, strong, colimit, or inductive topology) on a set  with respect to a family of functions from topological spaces into  is the finest topology on  that makes all those functions continuous. 

The quotient topology on a quotient space is a final topology, with respect to a single surjective function, namely the quotient map. The disjoint union topology is the final topology with respect to the inclusion maps. The final topology is also the topology that every direct limit in the category of topological spaces is endowed with, and it is in the context of direct limits that the final topology often appears.  A topology is coherent with some collection of subspaces if and only if it is the final topology induced by the natural inclusions.  

The dual notion is the initial topology, which for a given family of functions from a set  into topological spaces is the coarsest topology on  that makes those functions continuous.

Definition 

Given a set  and an -indexed family of topological spaces  with associated functions

is continuous for each .  

Explicitly, the final topology may be described as follows:

The closed subsets have an analogous characterization:

But the same construction can be performed if  is a proper class of functions, and the result is still well-defined in Zermelo–Fraenkel set theory. For more on this, see for example the discussion here. As an example, a commonly used variant of the notion of compactly generated space is defined as the final topology with respect to a proper class of functions.

Examples 

The important special case where the family of maps  consists of a single surjective map can be completely characterized using the notion of quotient maps. A surjective function  between topological spaces is a quotient map if and only if the topology   on  coincides with the final topology  induced by the family . In particular: the quotient topology is the final topology on the quotient space induced by the quotient map. 

The final topology on a set  induced by a family of -valued maps can be viewed as a far reaching generalization of the quotient topology, where multiple maps may be used instead of just one and where these maps are not required to be surjections. 

Given topological spaces , the disjoint union topology on the disjoint union  is the final topology on the disjoint union induced by the natural injections.

The direct limit of any direct system of spaces and continuous maps is the set-theoretic direct limit together with the final topology determined by the canonical morphisms. 

The étalé space of a sheaf is topologized by a final topology. 

A first-countable Hausdorff space  is locally path-connected if and only if  is equal to the final topology on  induced by the set  of all continuous maps  where any such map is called a path in 

Properties

Characterization via continuous maps 

Behavior under composition 

As a consequence: if  is the final topology on  induced by the family  and if  is any surjective map valued in some topological space  then  is a quotient map if and only if  has the final topology induced by the maps  

By the universal property of the disjoint union topology we know that given any family of continuous maps  there is a unique continuous map

that is compatible with the natural injections.
If the family of maps    (i.e. each  lies in the image of some ) then the map  will be a quotient map if and only if  has the final topology induced by the maps

Effects of changing the family of maps

Throughout, let  be a family of -valued maps with each map being of the form  and let  denote the final topology on  induced by  
The definition of the final topology guarantees that for every index  the map  is continuous. 

For any subset  the final topology  on  will be  than (and possibly equal to) the topology ; that is,  implies  where set equality might hold even if  is a proper subset of  

Suppose that in addition,  is an -indexed family of -valued maps  whose domains are topological spaces  
If every  is continuous then adding these maps to the family  will  change the final topology on  that is,  
Explicitly, this means that the final topology on  induced by the "extended family"  is equal to the final topology  induced by the original family  
However, had there instead existed even just one map  such that  was  continuous, then the final topology  on  induced by the "extended family"  would necessarily be  than the final topology  induced by  that is,  (see this footnote for an explanation).

Coherence with subspaces 

Let  be a topological space and let  be a family of subspaces of  where importantly, the word "sub" is used to indicate that each subset  is endowed with the subspace topology  inherited from  
The space  is said to be  with the family  of subspaces if  where  denotes the final topology induced by the inclusion maps  where for every  the inclusion map takes the form
 

Unraveling the definition,  is coherent with  if and only if the following statement is true: 
for every subset   is open in  if and only if for every   is open in the subspace 

Closed sets can be checked instead:  is coherent with  if and only if for every subset   is closed in  if and only if for every   is closed in  

For example, if  is a cover of a topological space  by open subspaces (i.e. open subsets of  endowed with the subspace topology) then  is coherent with  
The disjoint union is the final topology with respect to the family of canonical injections. 
A space  is called  and a  if  is coherent with the set  of all compact subspaces of  
All first-countable spaces and all Hausdorff locally compact spaces are -spaces, so that in particular, every manifold and every metrizable space is coherent with the family of all its compact subspaces.

As demonstrated by the examples that follows, under certain circumstance, it may be possible to characterize a more general final topology in terms of coherence with subspaces. 
Let  be a family of -valued maps with each map being of the form  and let  denote the final topology on  induced by  
If for every  the map  is a quotient map then  if and only if  is coherent with the set of all images

Final topology on the direct limit of finite-dimensional Euclidean spaces 

Let 

For every natural number  let  denote the usual Euclidean space endowed with the Euclidean topology and let  denote the inclusion map defined by  so that its image is

and consequently,
 

Endow the set  with the final topology  induced by the family  of all inclusion maps. 
With this topology,  becomes a complete Hausdorff locally convex sequential topological vector space that is  a Fréchet–Urysohn space. 
Endow the image  with the final topology induced on it by the bijection  that is, it is endowed with the Euclidean topology transferred to it from  via  
A subset  is open (respectively, closed) in  if and only if for every  the set  is an open (respectively, closed) subset of  
The topology  is coherent with the family of subspaces  
This makes  into an LB-space. 

Under this identification,  becomes a direct limit of the direct system  where for every  the map  is the inclusion map defined by  where there are  trailing zeros.

Categorical description 

In the language of category theory, the final topology construction can be described as follows. Let  be a functor from a discrete category  to the category of topological spaces Top that selects the spaces  for  Let  be the diagonal functor from Top to the functor category TopJ (this functor sends each space  to the constant functor to ).

See also

Notes

Citations

References

 
 . (Provides a short, general introduction in section 9 and Exercise 9H)
  

General topology